Táta Vega (born Carmen Rosa Vega, October 7, 1951) is an American vocalist, whose career spans theater, film, and a variety of musical genres.

Early life
Vega was born in Jamaica Queens, New York and raised between New York, Chicago, Texas, Panama and Puerto Rico. She is of Puerto Rican, Dominican, African, Spanish and Italian descent. Her parents are Luis Alfredo De La Vega, who served in the United States Air Force, and Rosaura Maltés. As a result of her father's work, the family moved frequently. Before she was even a teenager, the family lived in Panama, Puerto Rico, San Antonio, Texas, and Colorado Springs, Colorado. Her father nicknamed her Táta, because that was the first word she uttered as a child.  At the age of 17, she had her name legally changed.

Career
Vega began her professional singing career in 1963. In California (1969–70) she was cast in the Los Angeles, California production of the Broadway musical, Hair. From there went on to join the group Pollution (managed by Max Baer Jr.), led by Dobie Gray (who also appeared in the Los Angeles cast of Hair). While performing in another group with vocalists Brie Brandt and Laurie Ann Bell at the Troubadour, Berry Gordy was in the audience and signed them on the spot. As Earthquire, the group released a self-titled album produced by Tom Wilson in 1972 on Motown's Natural Resources label. After the album failed to make a commercial impact, Motown dropped the group, but retained her.

After the demise of Earthquire, Vega continued to work steadily in Top 40 bands and occasionally with some former members of Pollution. After hearing her voice on a demo for Jobete, Motown's publishing wing, producer Winston Monseque and Motown executive Iris Gordy, were interested in managing her.

Vega went on to release four solo albums on the Tamla record label: Full Speed Ahead (1976), Totally Táta (1977), Try My Love (1978), and Givin' All My Love (1981).  

She is probably best remembered in the UK for her 1979 release, "Get It Up for Love", from the album, Try My Love written by Ned Doheny.  This was released a year later than the LP on 12" format (Motown 12 TMG 1140) as well as 45 RPM.  It proved to be popular in the discos in the late 1970s in the UK.

She has had an active career as a lead backing vocalist, working with Russ Taff, Stevie Wonder, Andraé Crouch, Chaka Khan, Patti LaBelle, Michael Jackson, Ray Charles and Madonna, singing duets with Lou Rawls, Jermaine Jackson, Peter Rivera with Rare Earth and Michael Sembello. Vega is featured on the 2010 Elton John and Leon Russell CD The Union.   She also worked in film, performing the voice of Shug Avery in The Color Purple; she is featured on four songs on the 1986 soundtrack album, one of which, "Miss Celie's Blues (Sister)", was nominated for an Academy Award in the Best Song category.

In 1985, Vega was nominated for Best Soul female Gospel Performance at the 27th annual Grammy Awards For her vocals on "Oh, It is Jesus", written by Andrae Crouch.

In 1994, she recorded two Spanish versions of the song "Circle of Life" from Disney's The Lion King, one for Latin America ("Ciclo Sin Fin") and the other one for Spain ("El ciclo de la vida").

In 1998, she signed with Quincy Jones' Qwest Records and released a gospel album, Now I See, which was nominated for a Stellar award.

In 2006, Vega signed with Do Rite Records, releasing a gospel album entitled This Joy on October 27, 2009.

In 2010 Tata joined Elton John's band as a full-time backing vocalist along with Rose Stone, Lisa Stone and Jean Johnson (singer) Witherspoon.

In 2011, her first two solo albums, Full Speed Ahead and Totally Táta (1977), were reissued on CD by soulmusic.com records.
 
On January 18, 2013, Vega, alongside Darlene Love, Merry Clayton, Lisa Fischer and Judith Hill, premiered 20 Feet from Stardom, a documentary about background singers, at Robert Redford's annual Sundance Film Festival.

On February 18, 2014, in the wake of 20 Feet from Stardom'''s success, her solo albums at Motown were released digitally.

Personal life
Vega has two daughters, Angelica and Chloe (b. 1990)

Discography
As group member
1971: Pollution; Pollution (Prophesy Records)
1972: Pollution; Pollution II (Prophesy)
1972: Earthquire; Earthquire (Natural Resources/Motown)

Solo albums
1976: 
1977: 
1978: 
1980: Givin' All My Love (Tamla Motown)
1988: Time's So Right1998: 
2009: This Joy (Do Rite Records)

Appearances on other albums
1972: The Hot Rock OST, Quincy Jones
1979: Journey Through the Secret Life of Plants, Stevie Wonder
1979: Pops, We Love You, Various artists; guest vocalist
1985: The Color Purple (movie soundtrack)
1985: Mathematics, Melissa Manchester; background vocals
1985: Medals, Russ Taff; background vocals
1985: No Time to Lose, Andraé Crouch; "Right Now", "Oh, It Is Jesus"
1986: Frontline, Koinonia
1986: Someone, El DeBarge
1986: Without Walls, Michael Sembello
1986: Howard the Duck (soundtrack), Thomas Dolby; "I'm On My Way"
1988: Back to Avalon, Kenny Loggins
1988: Non Stop, Julio Iglesias; background vocals
1988: The Real Me, Patti Austin; background vocals
1990: Love Is the Reason, Engelbert Humperdinck
1991: Give in to the Rhythm, Arthur Baker; "Let There Be Love", "Inspiration"
1991: The Comfort Zone, Vanessa Williams; background vocals
1991: Turn It Up, Oaktown's 357; guest vocalist
1992: Live!, Patti LaBelle; background vocals
1993: My World, Ray Charles; background vocals
1994: The Gate To The Mind's Eye (soundtrack), Thomas Dolby; "Armageddon"
1994: A To a Higher Place, Tramaine Hawkins; background vocals
1994: El Rey Leon [Musica Original de la Pelicula], Hans Zimmer; "Ciclo Sin Fin"
1994: Is There Anybody Out There?, Gloria Loring; background vocals
1994: Mercy, Andraé Crouch; background vocals
1994: Reach, Patti Austin; background vocals
1995: Sisters: The Story Goes On, various artists; "You Don't Have to Know Why"
1995: Am I Still in Your Heart, Chuck Negron; background vocals
1995: Gary Oliver Gary Oliver; background vocals
1986: Wildcats [Motion Picture Soundtrack]; "Love Lives Alone"
1997: Pray, Andraé Crouch
1998: The Gift of Christmas, Andraé Crouch
1999: Tropico/Seven the Hard Way, Pat Benatar
2001: If We Pray Anointed; background vocals
2001: Joy to the World, Chuck Negron
2001 : Songs from the West Coast, Elton John; background vocals
2002: Life and Love, Philip Bailey; background vocals
2002: Night of Your Return, Fernando Ortega
2002: Real, Israel & New Breed
2002: The Gospel According to Jazz: Chapter 2, Kirk Whalum; "El Todopoderoso"
2005: Mighty Wind, Andraé Crouch; "I Was Glad"
2006: The Lord's Prayer: A Musical Tribute; "Give Us This Day Our Daily Bread" (with Sheila E.)
2006: Unbreakable Bond, GB5; "You Who Reigns"
2011: Low Country Blues, Gregg Allman; background vocals
2011: The Journey, Andraé Crouch; "Somebody Told Me About Jesus", "He Has a Plan For Me"
2013: Live in Los Angeles, Andraé Crouch; background vocals
2013: 20 Feet from Stardom'' soundtrack; featured vocalist and background vocals

Filmography

References

External links
 
 
 Soulwalking – Tata Vega Page

1951 births
American women singers
American Pentecostals
American soul musicians
Elton John Band members
Living people
Motown artists
People from Queens, New York
Singers from New York City
American musicians of Puerto Rican descent
American people of Dominican Republic descent
American people of Italian descent